The 145th Street station is a local station on the IRT Broadway–Seventh Avenue Line of the New York City Subway. Located at the intersection of Broadway and 145th Street in Hamilton Heights, Manhattan, it is served by the 1 train at all times.

The 145th Street station was constructed for the Interborough Rapid Transit Company (IRT) as part of the city's first subway line, which was approved in 1900. Construction of the line segment that includes 145th Street began on May 14 of the same year. The station opened on October 27, 1904, as one of the original 28 stations of the New York City Subway. The station's platforms were lengthened in 1948.

The 145th Street station contains two side platforms and three tracks; the center track is not used in regular service. The station was built with tile and mosaic decorations. The platforms contain exits to 145th Street and Broadway and are not connected to each other within fare control.

History

Construction and opening 
Planning for a subway line in New York City dates to 1864. However, development of what would become the city's first subway line did not start until 1894, when the New York State Legislature authorized the Rapid Transit Act. The subway plans were drawn up by a team of engineers led by William Barclay Parsons, chief engineer of the Rapid Transit Commission. It called for a subway line from New York City Hall in lower Manhattan to the Upper West Side, where two branches would lead north into the Bronx. A plan was formally adopted in 1897, and all legal conflicts concerning the route alignment were resolved near the end of 1899.

The Rapid Transit Construction Company, organized by John B. McDonald and funded by August Belmont Jr., signed the initial Contract 1 with the Rapid Transit Commission in February 1900, under which it would construct the subway and maintain a 50-year operating lease from the opening of the line. In 1901, the firm of Heins & LaFarge was hired to design the underground stations. Belmont incorporated the Interborough Rapid Transit Company (IRT) in April 1902 to operate the subway.

The 145th Street station was constructed as part of the IRT's West Side Line (now the Broadway–Seventh Avenue Line) from 133rd Street to a point 100 feet (30 m) north of 182nd Street. Work on this section was conducted by L. B. McCabe & Brother, who started building the tunnel segment on May 14, 1900. The section of the West Side Line around this station was originally planned as a two-track line, but in early 1901, was changed to a three-track structure to permit train storage in the center track. A third track was added directly north of 96th Street, immediately east of the originally planned two tracks. By late 1903, the subway was nearly complete, but the IRT Powerhouse and the system's electrical substations were still under construction, delaying the system's opening.

The 145th Street station opened on October 27, 1904, as the northern terminal station of the original 28-station New York City Subway line to City Hall. The line was subsequently extended one stop to 157th Street in December 1904, and ultimately was extended to 242nd Street in the Bronx in 1908.

Service changes and station renovations 
After the first subway line was completed in 1908, the station was served by West Side local and express trains. Express trains began at South Ferry in Manhattan or Atlantic Avenue in Brooklyn, and ended at 242nd Street in the Bronx. Local trains ran from City Hall to 242nd Street during rush hours, continuing south from City Hall to South Ferry at other times. In 1918, the Broadway–Seventh Avenue Line opened south of Times Square–42nd Street, thereby dividing the original line into an "H"-shaped system. The original subway north of Times Square thus became part of the Broadway–Seventh Avenue Line. Local trains were sent to South Ferry, while express trains used the new Clark Street Tunnel to Brooklyn.

To address overcrowding, in 1909, the New York Public Service Commission proposed lengthening platforms at stations along the original IRT subway. As part of a modification to the IRT's construction contracts, made on January 18, 1910, the company was to lengthen station platforms to accommodate ten-car express and six-car local trains. In addition to $1.5 million (equivalent to $ million in ) spent on platform lengthening, $500,000 was spent on building additional entrances and exits. It was anticipated that these improvements would increase capacity by 25 percent. The northbound platform at the 145th Street station was extended  to the south, while the southbound platform was not lengthened. The work involved reconstructing the interlocking between the center and northbound tracks. Six-car local trains began operating in October 1910, and ten-car express trains began running on the West Side Line on January 24, 1911. Subsequently, the station could accommodate six-car local trains, but ten-car trains could not open some of their doors.

The city government took over the IRT's operations on June 12, 1940. A contract for the platform extensions at 145th Street and eight other stations on the line was awarded to Spencer, White & Prentis Inc. in October 1946. The platform extensions at these stations were opened in stages. On April 6, 1948, the platform extension at 145th Street opened. Simultaneously, the IRT routes were given numbered designations with the introduction of "R-type" rolling stock, which contained rollsigns with numbered designations for each service. The route to 242nd Street became known as the 1. In 1959, all 1 trains became local.

In April 1988, the New York City Transit Authority (NYCTA) unveiled plans to speed up service on the Broadway–Seventh Avenue Line through the implementation of a skip-stop service: the 9 train. When skip-stop service began on August 21, 1989, skip-stop service was implemented during rush hours and middays. 145th Street was the southernmost local stop that was served by the 9 during rush hours and middays and the 1 at other times. On September 4, 1994, midday skip-stop service was discontinued. Skip-stop service ended on May 27, 2005, as a result of a decrease in the number of riders who benefited.

Station layout

This station was part of the original subway, and has two side platforms and three tracks, the center one being an unused express track. The platform extensions are at the southern ends of the uptown platform and the northern end of the downtown platform, making them slightly offset.

Design
As with other stations built as part of the original IRT, the station was constructed using a cut-and-cover method. The tunnel is covered by a "U"-shaped trough that contains utility pipes and wires. Each platform consists of  concrete slabs, beneath which are drainage basins. The original platforms contain circular, cast-iron Doric-style columns spaced every , while the platform extensions contain I-beam columns. Additional columns between the tracks, spaced every , support the jack-arched concrete station roofs. There is a  gap between the trough wall and the platform walls, which are made of -thick brick covered over by a tiled finish.

The decorative scheme consists of blue tile tablets; blue tile bands; a white terracotta cornice; and light blue terracotta plaques. The mosaic tiles at all original IRT stations were manufactured by the American Encaustic Tile Company, which subcontracted the installations at each station. The decorative work was performed by tile contractor Manhattan Glass Tile Company and terracotta contractor Atlantic Terra Cotta Company. The platforms contain their original trim line of green with gray borders. "145" in white lettering on a dark border are tiled onto the trim. The station's other name tablets show "145TH ST." in a multi-color mosaic. The directional signs read also read "145TH ST." in white lettering on a black border.

Track layout

The northbound local track merges with the center track north of the station and the line continues north as two tracks. The switch from the southbound track to the center track is south of the station.

Just south of the station lies the underground 137th Street Yard, which is visible from passing trains. The track layout allows northbound trains to bypass this station by switching to the center express track in the 137th Street Yard.

Exits
Both platforms have same-level fare control containing a bank of turnstiles, token booth, and staircases to the street. The northbound platform has two staircases (one to each eastern corner of Broadway and 145th Street) and the southbound platform has a single staircase to the northwestern corner. There are no crossovers or crossunders to allow transfers between directions.

References

External links 

 
 Station Reporter – 1 Train
 Forgotten NY – Original 28 – NYC's First 28 Subway Stations
 The Subway Nut – 145th Street Pictures 
 145th Street entrance from Google Maps Street View
 Platforms from Google Maps Street View

IRT Broadway–Seventh Avenue Line stations
Broadway (Manhattan)
Harlem
New York City Subway stations in Manhattan
Railway stations in the United States opened in 1904
Hamilton Heights, Manhattan
1904 establishments in New York City